The History of Eternity is a 2014 Brazilian drama film directed by Camilo Cavalcante.

Cast 
 Marcélia Cartaxo - Querência
 Irandhir Santos - João
 Zezita de Matos - Dona Das Dores

References

External links 

2014 drama films
Brazilian drama films
2010s Portuguese-language films